Celebrity Big Brother is a British television reality game show based on the Dutch show Big Brother, created by producer John de Mol in 1997, which aired from 2001 to 2018. The show followed a number of celebrity contestants, known as housemates, who were isolated from the outside world for an extended period of time in a custom built House. Each week, one of the housemates is evicted by a public vote, with the last housemate named the winner. The series takes its name from the character in George Orwell's 1949 novel Nineteen Eighty-Four.

Celebrity Big Brother began as a one-time spin-off series to the original Big Brother UK, and premiered on Channel 4 on 9 March 2001. Following the successful first series, the show returned the following year for a second series. Though the show did not air for the next two years, it returned in 2005 and 2006. Following the highly controversial fifth series in 2007, the show did not return in 2008. It did air in 2009, but it was officially axed after the seventh series in 2010 when Channel 4 chose to cancel the programme as well as the main series. Despite this, it was picked up by Channel 5, and Celebrity Big Brother returned in 2011. Since 2012, two editions of Celebrity Big Brother have aired each year, with one airing in January and one airing following the conclusion of the civilian series in August. The show was initially hosted by Davina McCall from its inception to its cancellation by Channel 4. Despite being offered the position of host following the show's move to Channel 5, McCall chose not to return. Brian Dowling, who had won on Big Brother 2 and Ultimate Big Brother, replaced McCall as the host of the series. Dowling hosted the eighth to eleventh series, before being replaced by Emma Willis from the twelfth series onward. Marcus Bentley has narrated the series since its inception in 2001.

Much like its predecessor, Celebrity Big Brother was met with commercial success and has also received extensive media coverage and publicity since it premiered. It has been covered in spin-off series such as Big Brother's Big Mouth and Big Brother's Bit on the Side, which also covered the main series. Similar to the parent series, Celebrity Big Brother has been the source of much controversy and criticism, most notably during the 2007 series. Following this, a spin-off series known as Big Brother: Celebrity Hijack aired in 2008 in the place of Celebrity Big Brother. It has been noted that numerous celebrities who have appeared on the series have become more prominent figures in the media than before.

On 14 September 2018, Channel 5 announced that Big Brother and Celebrity Big Brother would not be returning to the channel after the end of the nineteenth regular series. The final series of Celebrity Big Brother was won by Ryan Thomas on 10 September 2018.

In July 2022, ITV2 announced that they were reviving Big Brother in 2023. However, it is unknown whether they plan to revive Celebrity Big Brother as of now.

History

Main series

Channel 4 (2001–2010)

In 2000, the reality series Big Brother premiered in the United Kingdom and immediately became a ratings success. Following the success of the first series, it was confirmed that a celebrity edition of the show was in the works. Celebrity Big Brother aired in March 2001 as a one-time special on Channel 4 in association with the BBC's Comic Relief charity telethon. Due to the tie-in with Comic Relief, the first series was partly broadcast on BBC One in the week leading up to the telethon. It lasted for eight days, and was ultimately won by comedian Jack Dee. With the first series proving to be a success, a second series was later confirmed. Celebrity Big Brother 2 premiered on 20 November 2002, and concluded when Mark Owen was crowned the winner after 10 days in the house. Celebrity Big Brother did not air for the next two years, with Channel 4 choosing to air the spin-off series Teen Big Brother: The Experiment in 2003 and Big Brother Panto in 2004. In 2005, the show officially returned with its third series, which launched on 6 January. Lasting for a total of eighteen days, the series was won by Mark "Bez" Berry. The fourth edition of the show premiered on 5 January 2006 and was won by Chantelle Houghton, who ironically enough was the only housemate to not be a celebrity. The fifth series launched on 3 January 2007. This series saw Jade Goody, who had risen to fame after appearing on Big Brother 3, enter the house as a housemate. The fifth series became the most controversial series to date, when accusations of racism towards housemate Shilpa Shetty arose against Goody and other housemates. Shetty ultimately went on to win the series, while Goody was evicted after spending two weeks in the house. Following the controversy surrounding the fifth series, Celebrity Big Brother did not air in 2008. It did, however, return in 2009 and 2010, with the 2010 series being announced as the final one.

Channel 5 (2011–2018)

After Richard Desmond bought Channel 5 in 2010, he said he was keen to acquire both Big Brother and Celebrity Big Brother. Meanwhile, Endemol had been granted permission to keep the Big Brother House at the Elstree TV Studios until 30 September 2013. On 2 April 2011, The Daily Star, a newspaper owned by Desmond's Northern & Shell company, reported that Big Brother would be returning on Channel 5 in August 2011 with a Celebrity edition, followed by a main edition in September. Four days later, Channel 5 formally confirmed that it had signed a £200 million two-year contract with Endemol to screen Big Brother from 18 August 2011. Big Brother 2 winner Brian Dowling was announced as the new host. McCall declined the offer to host, having said goodbye to the show in 2010. Celebrity Big Brother 8 officially launched on 18 August 2011, and was won by Paddy Doherty. Beginning with the ninth series in 2012, two editions of Celebrity Big Brother were aired annually. The first series premiered in January, while the second premiered in the summer, either preceding or following the conclusion of the civilian series. Following the eleventh series, it was confirmed that Dowling had been axed as the host of both Big Brother and Celebrity Big Brother. Emma Willis was later revealed to be the new host of the show, and hosted from the twelfth until the twenty-second and final series, before the cancellation of Big Brother and Celebrity Big Brother was announced on 14 September 2018.

Spin-offs
Celebrity Big Brother has been host to various spin-off series throughout the years. Most notably, Big Brother: Celebrity Hijack aired in 2008 following the racism controversy surrounding the fifth series. The series lasted for a total of 26 days, with John Loughton being crowned the winner on the final day. Despite the success of Celebrity Big Brother, the spin-off series provided poor ratings and was not renewed. Ultimate Big Brother was the final series to air on Channel 4, and featured fourteen of the most memorable housemates from both Big Brother and Celebrity Big Brother competing in the series. Numerous other spin-offs have occurred throughout the series such as Big Brother's Big Mouth, hosted by Russell Brand, and Big Brother's Little Brother hosted by Dermot O'Leary. Following the show's move to Channel 5, Big Brother's Bit on the Side is the only currently airing spin-off series.

Format

Big Brother is a game show in which a group of celebrity contestants, referred to as housemates, live in isolation from the outside world in a custom built "house", constantly under video surveillance. During their time in the House, the housemates are required to nominate two of their fellow contestants for potential eviction, and the two or more with the most votes would be nominated. This process is mandatory for all housemates, and failure to comply could result in expulsion from the House. During the show's broadcast on Channel 4, the viewers would vote to evict one of the nominated housemates, and the housemate with the most votes would be removed from the House. The third series, however, did see the viewers vote to save one of the celebrities. Series 8–12, which aired under Channel 5, saw the public voting to save a housemate, and the housemate with the fewest votes would be evicted. The voting process can be done via telephone or online. When the final week arrives, the viewers vote for which of the remaining celebrities should win the series, and the housemate with the most votes becomes the winner. Unlike the main series, the celebrities are competing for the charity of their choice. The third series was the only series to see the celebrities competing for a prize fund for themselves.

During their time in the House, housemates are given weekly tasks to perform. The housemates wager a portion of their weekly shopping budget on the task, and either win double their wagered fund or lose the wagered fund depending on their performance in the task. The housemates are required to work as a group to complete their tasks, with the format of the tasks varying based on the number of remaining housemates. Throughout the series, some housemates have been given secret tasks that must either be completed individually or with a small group; failure to do so can result in the housemate being nominated or punished in the House. Should the housemates run out of the food provided for them, an emergency ration was available to them. The housemates are forbidden from discussing nominations, and doing so could result in punishment. The format of the series is mainly seen as a social experiment, and requires housemates to interact with others who may have differing ideals, beliefs, and prejudices. Housemates are also required to make visits to the Diary Room during their stay in the House, where they are able to share their thoughts and feelings on their fellow housemates and the game.

Series details and viewership

Notes

Sponsorships

Channel 4 (2001–2010)

Channel 5 (2011–2018)

 The Carphone Warehouse is the parent company of TalkTalk, the previous sponsor. It also had a deal of £2.5m-a-year to sponsor the Big Brother franchise
 Due to the race row, the sponsorship was cut off halfway through the series
 The cost of this sponsorship was £800,000
 This sponsorship was only shown after 9.00pm
 Celebrity Big Brother 17 had no sponsorship, making it the first ever series of both Big Brother and Celebrity Big Brother not to have a sponsor.

Controversy and criticism

Since its inception, Celebrity Big Brother has come under fire for reports of bullying, racism, and the physical and mental strain of appearing on the series.

See also
 Big Brother franchise
 List of Celebrity Big Brother housemates
 Celebrity Big Brother (U.S.)
 The Surreal Life, a programme similar to Celebrity Big Brother in the United States, on which Traci Bingham, Caprice Bourret, Janice Dickinson, Brigitte Nielsen and Verne Troyer have also appeared.

References

External links
 Celebrity Big Brother  at Channel5.com
 

2001 British television series debuts
2018 British television series endings
2000s British reality television series
2010s British reality television series
British television spin-offs
British television series revived after cancellation
English-language television shows
Big Brother (British TV series)
Celebrity Big Brother
BBC reality television shows
Channel 4 reality television shows
Channel 5 (British TV channel) reality television shows
Reality television spin-offs
Television series by Endemol
Television shows shot at Elstree Film Studios